This is a list of festivals in the Philippines. The majority of festivals in the Philippines, locally known as "fiestas", may have their own peryas (trade fairs with temporary amusement parks). The origin of most early fiestas are rooted in Christianity, dating back to the Spanish colonial period when the many communities (such as barrios and towns) of the predominantly Catholic Philippines almost always had a patron saint assigned to each of them. Originally encouraged by the Spanish to coincide with Christian holy days, early patronal festivals became vital instruments in spreading Christianity throughout the country.

Festivals in the Philippines can be religious, cultural, or both. Several of these are held to honor the local Roman Catholic patron saint, to commemorate local history and culture, to promote the community's products, or to celebrate a bountiful harvest. They can be marked by Holy Masses, processions, parades, theatrical play and reenactments, religious or cultural rituals, trade fairs, exhibits, concerts, pageants and various games and contests. However, festivals in the country are not limited to Christian origins. Many festivals also focus on Islamic or indigenous concepts. There are more than 42,000 known major and minor festivals in the Philippines, the majority of which are in the barangay (village) level. Due to the thousands of town, city, provincial, national, and village fiestas in the country, the Philippines has traditionally been known as the Capital of the World's Festivities.

Some festivals, such as Holy Week and Christmas, are declared as public holidays, and thus, are observed and celebrated nationwide.


List

The partial calendar list contains several of the oldest and larger religious and/or cultural festivals in the country. Each town, city, and village has a dedicated fiesta, resulting in thousands held throughout the year; a few are national in character. Some fiestas may contain multiple/conflicting dates and/or place entries.

January

February

March

April

May

June

July

August

September

October

November

December

See also

 Christmas in the Philippines
 Holy Week in the Philippines
 Film festivals in the Philippines
 Music festivals in the Philippines
 Public holidays in the Philippines
 Patronal festival

References

External links
Philippine Festivals and Events
Philippines Travel Hub
Official Philippine Tourism Website

Philippines
 
 
 Philippines
 Philippines
Festivals
Festivals